Jia Song or Jiasong may refer to:
 Song Jia (actress born 1962) (宋佳), Chinese actress
 Song Jia (actress, born 1980) (宋佳), Chinese actress and singer
 Jiasong, Nanhe County, Hebei, China, a township-level division of Hebei
 Jiasong, Zhenping County, Henan, China, a  township-level division of Henan

See also
 Song Jia (disambiguation)
 Song (disambiguation)
 JIA (disambiguation)